The 1899 Washington Senators baseball team finished the season with a 54–98 record, eleventh place in the National League.

The 25 home runs that right fielder Buck Freeman recorded were truly remarkable by the standards of the time; his tally was not surpassed until Babe Ruth hit 29 home runs with the 1919 Boston Red Sox.

When the NL contracted after the season, the Senators were disbanded. Owner J. Earl Wagner received $39,000 for his interest in the team.

Regular season

Season standings

Record vs. opponents

Opening Day lineup

Roster

Player stats

Batting

Starters by position 
Note: Pos = Position; G = Games played; AB = At bats; H = Hits; Avg. = Batting average; HR = Home runs; RBI = Runs batted in

Other batters 
Note: G = Games played; AB = At bats; H = Hits; Avg. = Batting average; HR = Home runs; RBI = Runs batted in

Pitching

Starting pitchers 
Note: G = Games pitched; IP = Innings pitched; W = Wins; L = Losses; ERA = Earned run average; SO = Strikeouts

Other pitchers 
Note: G = Games pitched; IP = Innings pitched; W = Wins; L = Losses; ERA = Earned run average; SO = Strikeouts

Relief pitchers 
Note: G = Games pitched; W = Wins; L = Losses; SV = Saves; ERA = Earned run average; SO = Strikeouts

Notes

References 
 1899 Washington Senators team page at Baseball Reference

Washington Senators (1891–1899) seasons
Washington Senators season
Washing